is the sixth single by Japanese idol group Hinatazaka46. It was released on October 27, 2021 through Sony Music Entertainment Japan and features the first appearance of Miku Kanemura as the lead performer of a title song.

Production and release 
The single was released in five versions: Type-A, Type-B, Type-C, Type-D, and a regular edition. All versions except for the regular edition also includes a Blu-ray Disc containing music videos and bonus videos.

Miku Kanemura was chosen as the center (lead performer) of the title song for the first time.

"Nando de mo Nando de mo" was used as the support song for the 41st All Japan High School Quiz Championship (全国高等学校クイズ選手権).

Nao Kosaka was on health leave during production and did not participate in the single.

Track listing 
All lyrics written by Yasushi Akimoto.

Type-A

Type-B

Type-C

Type-D

Regular edition

Participating members

"Tteka" 
Center: Miku Kanemura

 1st row: Mei Higashimura, Kyōko Saitō, Miku Kanemura, Shiho Katō, Akari Nibu
 2nd row: Kumi Sasaki, Yūka Kageyama, Konoka Matsuda, Mirei Sasaki, Hina Kawata, Miho Watanabe, Sarina Ushio
 3rd row: Mikuni Takahashi, Mana Takase, Marī Morimoto, Ayaka Takamoto, Hinano Kamimura, Hiyori Hamagishi, Manamo Miyata, Haruyo Yamaguchi, Suzuka Tomita

"Nando de mo Nando de mo" 
Center: Hinano Kamimura

 1st row: Hina Kawata, Akari Nibu, Hinano Kamimura, Miku Kanemura, Konoka Matsuda
 2nd row:  Hiyori Hamagishi, Manamo Miyata, Marī Morimoto, Mikuni Takahashi, Haruyo Yamaguchi, Miho Watanabe, Suzuka Tomita
 3rd row: Kumi Sasaki, Yūka Kageyama, Ayaka Takamoto, Shiho Katō, Mirei Sasaki, Kyōko Saitō, Mei Higashimura, Mana Takase, Sarina Ushio

"Omoigakenai Double Rainbow" 
Center: Miku Kanemura

 1st row: Mei Higashimura, Kyōko Saitō, Miku Kanemura, Shiho Katō, Akari Nibu
 2nd row: Kumi Sasaki, Yūka Kageyama, Konoka Matsuda, Mirei Sasaki, Hina Kawata, Miho Watanabe, Sarina Ushio
 3rd row: Mikuni Takahashi, Mana Takase, Marī Morimoto, Ayaka Takamoto, Hinano Kamimura, Hiyori Hamagishi, Manamo Miyata, Haruyo Yamaguchi, Suzuka Tomita

"Yume wa Nansai ma de?" 
 Mei Higashimura, Ayaka Takamoto

"Akubi Letter" 
 Akari Nibu, Miku Kanemura, Miho Watanabe

"Suppai Jiko Keno" 
 Haruyo Yamaguchi, Hiyori Hamagishi, Mirei Sasaki, Hina Kawata

"Additional Time" 
Center: Miku Kanemura

 1st row: Mei Higashimura, Kyōko Saitō, Miku Kanemura, Shiho Katō, Akari Nibu
 2nd row: Kumi Sasaki, Yūka Kageyama, Konoka Matsuda, Mirei Sasaki, Hina Kawata, Miho Watanabe, Sarina Ushio
 3rd row: Mikuni Takahashi, Mana Takase, Marī Morimoto, Ayaka Takamoto, Hinano Kamimura, Hiyori Hamagishi, Manamo Miyata, Haruyo Yamaguchi, Suzuka Tomita

Charts

Weekly charts

Year-end charts

Certifications

References 

2021 singles
2021 songs
Hinatazaka46 songs
Songs with lyrics by Yasushi Akimoto
Sony Music Entertainment Japan singles
Oricon Weekly number-one singles
Billboard Japan Hot 100 number-one singles